The 2007 OFC Women's Championship of women's association football took place in Lae, Papua New Guinea between 9 April and 13 April. It was the eighth edition of the tournament.

The tournament was also known as the OFC Women's World Cup Qualifier, as the winner qualified for the 2007 Women's World Cup.

New Zealand have never lost a match to any of their three competitors at the OFC Women's Championship, with the closest result being a 2–0 win over Papua New Guinea in 1995.

The Cook Islands, Fiji, New Caledonia, Samoa, Tahiti and Vanuatu were announced to take part, but withdrew before the tournament was organised.

New Zealand won the tournament and qualified to their first FIFA Women's World Cup in 16 years.

Participating nations
Of the eleven nations affiliated to the Oceania Football Confederation, only four entered the tournament.

Officials
The following referees and assistant referees were named for the tournament.

Referees
 Amelia Morris
 Job Minan Ponis
 Lencie Fred

Assistant Referees
 Rohitesh Dayal
 Joakim Salaiau Sosongan
 Hilary Ani
 Jackson Namo
 Neil Polosso
 Hamilton Siau

Results

Awards

Goalscorers
4 goals

 Nicky Smith
 Kirsty Yallop

3 goals
 Deslyn Siniu
2 goals

 Simone Ferrara
 Wendi Henderson
 Ria Percival
 Zoe Thompson
 Jacqueline Chalau

1 goal

 Abby Erceg
 Anna Green
 Emma Kete
 Hayley Moorwood
 Rebecca Smith
 Prudence Fula
 Vasi Feke

Own goals

 Prudence Fula (for Papua New Guinea)
 Mele Vaisioa Mahe Niukapu (for Papua New Guinea)

References

External links
OFC Event report (PDF)
Table & results at RSSSF.com

Women's Championship
OFC Women's Nations Cup tournaments
OFC
2007
2007 in Papua New Guinean sport
2006–07 in New Zealand association football
OFC